"Special Occasion" is a 1968 hit single recorded by Motown Records R&B group Smokey Robinson and The Miracles, issued by its Tamla Records subsidiary and taken from the album of the same name.  It was written and composed by Miracles lead singer Smokey Robinson and Motown staff songwriter Al Cleveland, the authors of the group's Top 10 million-selling smash, "I Second That Emotion", the previous year.

Song background
A joyous up-tempo tune with a calypso influence, Smokey, as the song's narrator, celebrates the happiness of being in love with his new girl, comparing it with other "special occasions" one has in life, such as dressing up for a night on the town ("like when you dress up in your tie and tails"), graduation ("like when in school, you get your cap and gown"), or giving a "salute" to something special ("something that calls for a toast of champagne"). Miracle Marv Tarplin's outstanding guitar work is evident throughout, while the other Miracles, Bobby, Ronnie, Pete and Claudette, punctuate the song's melodies with their tight harmonies on the chorus and elsewhere.

Reception
Cash Box called it a "mid-speed song" with "extremely effective orchestration."

Chart performance
"Special Occasion" was a Billboard Top 30 Pop hit, peaking at #26, and was a Top 10 R&B hit as well, peaking at #4.

Credits: The Miracles

Personnel
Smokey Robinson lead vocals
Claudette Robinson soprano
Pete Moore bass vocals
Marv Tarplin guitar
Ronnie White baritone
Bobby Rogers tenor

Other credits
The Funk Brothers instruments

Cover versions
"Special Occasion" has inspired a cover version by Jazz/R&B singer Jim Gilstrap. Its flip side, "Give Her Up", was a cover of a song Smokey had written for Martha & the Vandellas in 1963. "Give Her Up", like many Miracles' "B" sides, was also a popular regional hit.

References

External links
 

The Miracles songs
Songs written by Smokey Robinson
1968 songs
Motown singles
Song recordings produced by Smokey Robinson